Ji Cheng (1582 – c. 1642) was a Ming dynasty garden designer.

Ji Cheng was born in the 10th year of the reign of the Wanli Emperor (1582) in Tongli, Wujiang County, Jiangsu province.
 
As a youth, Ji Cheng made a name for himself as a landscape painter and private garden designer, he admired two Northern Song painters: Guan Tong and Jing Hao.

During his lifetime, he designed numerous private gardens in Southern China. In his late years, he summarized his lifetime experience into a monograph on landscape design:, Yuanye: The Craft of Gardens, 1631.

Ji Cheng's Yuanye, is the first monograph dedicated to garden architecture in the world. His work has been translated into many languages.

Ji Cheng's thirty-five room former residence at Hueichuan Bridge, Tongli, is now a tourist attraction.

"The garden is created by the human hand, but should appear as if created by heaven."

References

Notes

Bibliography
Ji Cheng: Yuan Ye Tu Shuo, ed. Zhou Nong, Shandong Huabao Chubanshe, 2004, 
Ji Cheng: Yuan Ye, ed. Wang Changmei, Golden Maple Publishing House. 
Translations
Ji Cheng: Craft of Gardens, Yale University Press, 1988, Translated by Alison Hardie 
Yuanye, le traite du jardin, Ji Cheng, Traduit par Che Bing Chiu 

1582 births
1640s deaths
Landscape or garden designers
Architects from Suzhou
Ming dynasty artists